The following are the national records in track cycling in China maintained by Chinese Taipei Cycling Association.

Men

Women

References

External links
 Chinese Taipei Cycling Association web site
 Records

Taipei
Records in track cycling
Track cycling
track cycling